Folketidende was a Norwegian newspaper published in Mandal between 1865 and 1879.

History and profile
Folketidende was founded in 1865 by Søren Jaabæk. The paper was a four-page publication. It focused on small government and liberalist politics. It went defunct in 1879.

References

Defunct newspapers published in Norway
Mandal, Norway
Norwegian-language newspapers
Newspapers established in 1865
Publications disestablished in 1879
Mass media in Vest-Agder
1865 establishments in Norway
1879 disestablishments in Norway